Italo Zilioli (born 24 September 1941) is an Italian former professional cyclist.

Born in Turin, he won 58 races as a professional, including the 1966 Züri-Metzgete. He also totaled 5 stage wins at the Giro d'Italia; however, he never won the major tour of his country. He finished the Giro in the top 5 on six occasions and made the podium four times, finishing 2nd in 1964, 1965 and 1966, and finishing 3rd in 1969 as a member of Filotex.

During the 1970 Tour de France he won stage 2 and took over the Yellow jersey, which caused a minor controversy as it angered his teammate Eddy Merckx, who was anticipated to wear the jersey for the majority of the race and repeat as champion. Zilioli held the jersey for three stages before relinquishing it to Merckx.

Zilioli lives in the province of Cuneo (Piedmont) and is responsible for the stage starts for Giro d'Italia.

Career achievements

Major results

1959
 1st  Road race, National Junior Road Championships
1963
 1st Giro del Veneto
 1st Giro dell'Appennino
 1st Tre Valli Varesine
 1st Giro dell'Emilia
 2nd Gran Piemonte
 5th Giro di Lombardia
 6th Overall Tour de Suisse
1st Stage 1
1964
 1st Coppa Ugo Agostoni
 1st Coppa Sabatini
 1st Giro del Veneto
 1st GP Monaco
 2nd Overall Giro d'Italia
 2nd Milano–Torino
 2nd Giro di Campania
 3rd Road race, National Road Championships
 3rd Overall Tour de Suisse
 3rd Genoa–Nice
 5th Giro di Lombardia
 8th Trofeo Laigueglia
 9th Giro di Romagna
 10th Tre Valli Varesine
1965
 1st Nice–Mont Agel
 1st Caen (with Franco Balmamion)
 1st Giro del Ticino
 2nd Overall Giro d'Italia
1st Stage 18
 2nd Coppa Placci
 2nd Giro del Veneto
 2nd Giro delle Tre Provincie
 2nd Gran Premio Industria e Commercio di Prato
 3rd Overall Paris–Nice
 4th Tre Valli Varesine
1966
 1st Gran Premio Industria e Commercio di Prato
 1st Züri-Metzgete
 2nd Overall Giro d'Italia
 2nd Road race, National Road Championships
 2nd Giro del Lazio
 2nd Tre Valli Varesine
 2nd Giro dell'Appennino
 3rd Coppa Placci
 3rd GP Montelupo
 3rd GP Valsassina
 6th Road race, UCI World Road Championships
 7th Giro di Lombardia
 7th Giro di Romagna
1967
 5th Trofeo Laigueglia
 7th Overall Paris–Nice
1968
 1st Giro di Campania
 2nd Overall Tirreno–Adriatico
1st Stage 3
 2nd Overall Giro di Sardegna
 4th Overall Giro d'Italia
1st Stage 5
1969
 3rd Overall Giro d'Italia
1st Stage 19
 3rd Road race, National Road Championships
 3rd Giro della Provincia di reggio Calabria
 4th Gran Premio Città di Camaiore
 4th GP Alghero
 7th Overall Tirreno–Adriatico
1970
 1st  Overall Setmana Catalana de Ciclisme
1st Stages 1b & 2
 1st Giro del Piemonte
 1st Giro delle Marche
 Tour de France
1st Stage 2
Held  after Stages 2–5b
 1st Stage 2 Vuelta Ciclista a la Comunidad Valenciana
 2nd Overall Tirreno–Adriatico
 2nd Giro del Lazio
 2nd Giro dell'Emilia
 3rd Giro dell'Appennino
 3rd GP Forli
 4th Milan–San Remo
 5th Overall Giro d'Italia
1st Stage 10
 8th Trofeo Laigueglia
 9th Liège–Bastogne–Liège
1971
 1st  Overall Tirreno–Adriatico
1st Stage 2
 1st GP Cecina
 1st Trofeo Laigueglia
 1st Stages 2 & 5 Setmana Catalana de Ciclisme
 2nd Giro del Veneto
 3rd Tre Valli Varesine
 7th Giro di Lombardia
 9th Giro dell'Emilia
1972
 1st Stage 10 Giro d'Italia
 2nd Giro di Campania
 3rd Col San Martino
 5th G.P. Camaiore
 5th Giro di Toscana
 7th Giro di Romagna
1973
 1st Giro dell'Appennino
 1st Coppa Placci
 1st GP Montelupo
 3rd Road race, National Road Championships
 3rd Tre Valli Varesine
 9th Giro dell'Emilia
 10th Giro di Lombardia
 10th Overall Tirreno–Adriatico
1974
 1st Stage 2 Tirreno–Adriatico
 3rd Milano–Torino
 5th Giro dell'Emilia
 5th Giro di Romagna
1975
 1st GP Cecina
 2nd Overall Giro di Sardegna
 5th Giro dell'Emilia
 8th Trofeo Laigueglia
 8th Milan–San Remo
 8th Giro di Toscana
 9th Overall Tour de Suisse
1976
 2nd Giro dell'Emilia

Grand Tour general classification results timeline

References

External links 

1941 births
Living people
Cyclists from Turin
Italian male cyclists
Italian Tour de France stage winners
Italian Giro d'Italia stage winners
Tour de Suisse stage winners